In linguistics, psychology, and literary theory, the concepts of deictic field and deictic shift are sometimes deployed in the study of narrative media. These terms provide a theoretical framework for helping literary analysts to conceptualize the ways in which readers redirect their attention away from their immediate surroundings as they become immersed in the reality generated by the text.

Deixis
The term "deixis" refers to the ways in which language encodes contextual information into its grammatical system. More broadly, deixis refers to the inherent ambiguity of certain linguistic expressions and the interpretive processes that communicants must perform in order to disambiguate these words and phrases. Such ambiguity can only be resolved by analyzing the context in which the utterance occurs.  To understand deixis, one must first understand that language grammaticalizes context-dependent features such as person, space, and time. When language is oriented toward its context, certain expressions in speech emerge that differentiate the "here" and "now" (proximal deixis) from the "then" and "there" (distal deixis). According to Karl Buhler, an Austrian psychologist who was one of the earliest to present a theory of deixis, "When philosophers, linguists, and narrative theorists attempt to understand the role of subjectivity in language and conversely, the role of language in subjectivity, they invariably notice a certain aspect of language which seems to depend on extralinguistic, subjective, occasion-specific considerations." Within the context of narrative, deixis reflects those aspects of storytelling by which the audience is pragmatically directed to understand the perspective of the narrator or the perspective of the story's characters in relation to their own story-external vantage point. Essentially, deictic expressions help form the layers of narrative that direct the audience to either the narratorial discourse or to the story world. "Deixis (adjectival form, deictic) is a psycholinguistic term for those aspects of meaning associated with self-world orientation". Deixis is an integral component of the lens by which the audience perceives the narrative.

Labov's narrative model
When examining perspectives on narration in natural-language environments, one must not ignore William Labov, who argues that stories of personal experience can be divided into distinct sections, each of which serves a unique function within the narrative progression. Labov schematizes the organization of natural narrative using the following conceptual units: abstract, orientation, complicating action, resolution, evaluation, and coda. Generally, anecdotal narratives tend to arrange these units in the order outlined; however, this is not an inflexible, structural progression that defines how every narrative must develop. For instance, sentences and phrasal items that serve an evaluative function can be interspersed throughout a narrative. Some stretches of narrative discourse also feature overlap among these Labovian categories. Each of Labov's narrative divisions serves a characteristic purpose typified by a particular section's grammatical construction and functional role within the unfolding narrative, but the boundaries of such divisions are not always clear-cut.

As a feature of natural language, deixis is an important element of oral narrative and can be realized in different ways in each of Labov's categories. According to Galbraith, "All language use depends on some felt relevance to situation, on the attention of participants, and their ability to lift out the topic....Like zero in mathematics and the dark space in the theater, deixis orients us within a situation without calling attention to itself". Two of Labov's categories that often feature deixis prominently are the "orientation" and the "coda". The orientation typically occurs near the beginning of a narrative and serves to introduce the characters, settings, and events. Given its presentative quality, the orientation shifts the deictic center away from the speaker's here-and-now into the spatiotemporal coordinates of the story, which logically must occur at a time prior to the story's enunciation. The coda occurs toward the end of a narrative and functions as a means of terminating the flow of story events. By doing so, the coda reorients the speakers and listeners out of the story world and back into the communicative present.

Deictic center 
The deictic center—sometimes called the "origo" or zero-point—represents the originating source in relation to which deictic expressions gain their context-dependent meaning. Often the deictic center is the speaker: thus, any tokens of "I" in the speaker's discourse must deictically refer back to the speaker as center; likewise, the word "you" must project outward from this center toward the addressee. Any participants not part of this communicative channel will be referred to in the third person. The theory of deixis is therefore egocentric in that the indexical anchorage of deictic expressions is a function of this zero-point of subjectivity. The "I"-center serves as the perceptual vantage point that surveys relations among salient contextual entities and events. Such a center, therefore, determines which deictic expressions are pragmatically licensed by a context that has been naturally delimited through this perceptual and evaluative locus. Thus, the appropriateness of a proximal "this" over a distal "that" is determined by the nearness of an object or a location in relation to the deictic zero-point.

A deictic field contains the range of bounded participants and objects, spatial locations and landmarks, and temporal frames that point back to some deictic center as the source for their pragmatic demarcation. The deictic field radiates out from the deictic center, and the boundaries of such a field enclose the scope of objects, spaces, and events that constitute a set from which deictic expressions might seek out a potential referent. These fields function as cognitive frames that participants in a discourse can use to conceptualize their contextual surroundings in relation to each interlocutor's (alternating) function as deictic center across communicative turns. Within the context of literature, the presence of multiple deictic fields in a text can be fruitfully analyzed using the cognitive principle of deictic shift (discussed below).

Deictic shift theory 
Deictic shift theory (DST) refers to a range of immersion processes by which readers imaginatively project hypothetical deictic centers that are anchored to communicative and experiential loci within a narrative. Such cognitive framing, theorists of DST argue, form a necessary part of the reader's involvement in narrative, whereby through a process of frame shifting the reader constructs a story world by interpreting the (deictic) cues instantiated in the text. Deictic shifting can be accomplished in several ways. The most basic shift involves the reader's initial immersion into the world of the story. Here the deictic center moves out of the here-and-now of the reader's physical environment and becomes anchored to some text-internal perceptual or presentative instance, in most cases the deictic center of a character or a narrator. Deictic shifts at the level of narration include those cues that implicate a covert or overt narrator—specifically, story commentary or instances when the narrator refers to himself or herself as an "I." Such instances of commentary and evaluation often reflect the perceptual field, as well as the interpretive and ideological stance, of the narrator as they present the story's events.

Within the world of the story, deictic shifts occur in a number of ways. A fundamental shift occurs when the deictic center moves from one character to another—for instance, in cases of omniscient thought report. Here the reader must adjust the deictic center accordingly and interprets the lens of the current focal window through the experiential subjectivity of the character-locus. Other forms of story-internal deictic shifts involve the cognitive framing associated with embedded narratives and other discourse-types: stories-within-stories, letters in epistolary fiction, diary entries, etc.
  
"Within literary scholarship, it is often noted that first and second person pronouns (and less so, and differently, third) facilitate readerly identification with the textually inscribed position (the position of the character or narrator designated by that pronoun), and evoke a sense of readerly conceptual immersion in the fictional world of the story, contributing to the ways in which the scene is imaginatively 'realized' in the mind of the reader, particularly the perspective from which the scene is conceptually visualized. Cognitive poetics and cognitive narratology have employed deictic shift theory, largely based on the work of Duchan, Bruder and Hewitt, to attempt to offer a cognitive account of how these interpretative effects are created. DST proposes that readers conceptually project to the contextual locus of the speaker of deictic cues in order to comprehend them, offering a model of how the deictic referents determining such contextual coordinates are processed by readers, and how this contributes to readers' conceptualization of the world of the story" (Deictic shifting in literature: Experimental analysis).

Deixis in narratology 
Buhler applied the theory of deixis to narratives. He proposed the concept of Zeigfeld, or deictic field, which operates in three modes: the first, ad oculos, "operates in the here-and-now of the speaker's sensible environment;" the second, anaphora, "operates in the context of the discourse itself considered as a structured environment;" and the third, what Buhler calls deixis at phantasma, operates in the context "of imagination and long-term memory." Buhler's model attempts "to describe the psychological and physical process whereby the live deictic field of our own bodily orientation and experience" is "transposed into an imaginative construction." According to Buhler, "the body-feeling representation, or Körpertastbild (what psychologists would probably now call the body schema), becomes loosened from its involvement with the HERE//NOW/I deictic coordinates of waking life in our immediate environment, and becomes available to translation into an environment we construct both conceptually and orientationally"; this deictic coordinate system is used "in the constructive environment to orient ourselves within 'the somewhere-realm of pure imagination and the there-and-there in memory'".

Katie Hamburger, a German narrative theorist, studied and theorized how deictic words are used in literature. In her work The Logic of Literature, she argued that there are two realms of language act: reality statement and fiction (Galbraith, 24-25). Reality statements are by someone and about something. "Acts of fictional narration, on the other hand, transfer their referentiality from the actuality of the historical world to the entertained reality of the fictive world, and transfer the subjectivity of the speaker to the subjectivity of the story world characters". Hamburger argued that this transfer occurs due to the use of deictic adverbs, and psychological verbs.

References

Literary concepts
Narratology